Orchidlands Estates (also known as Orchidland or Orchid Land Estates) is a census-designated place (CDP) in Hawaii County, Hawaii, United States located in the District of Puna. The population was 2,815 at the 2010 census, up from 1,731 at the 2000 census.

Geography
Orchidlands Estates is located on the east side of the island of Hawaii at  (19.560858, -155.012566). It is bordered to the northeast by Hawaiian Paradise Park, to the south by Ainaloa, to the southwest by Hawaiian Acres, and to the northwest by Kurtistown.

Demographics

As of the census of 2010, there were 2,815 people in 1,011 households residing in the CDP. The racial makeup of the CDP was 32.01% White, 0.82% African American, 0.64% American Indian & Alaska Native, 21.74% Asian, 10.98% Native Hawaiian & Pacific Islander, 1.74% from other races, and 32.08% from two or more races. Hispanic or Latino of any race were 14.67% of the population.

There were 1,011 households, out of which 28.0% had children under the age of 18 living with them.  The average household size was 2.78.

In the Orchidlands Estates CDP the population was spread out, with 25.2% under the age of 18, 10.1% from 18 to 24, 13.2% from 25 to 34, 18.3% from 35 to 49, 24.3% from 50 to 64, and 8.9% who were 65 years of age or older. For every 100 females, there were 104.1 males.  For every 100 males there were 96.0 females.

The median income for a household in the CDP at the 2000 census was $27,083, and the median income for a family in 2000 was $31,290. Males had a median income of $32,045 in 2000 versus $24,188 for females. The per capita income for the CDP in 2000 was $13,748.  About 24.1% of families and 27.6% of the population were below the poverty line in 2000, including 38.8% of those under age 18 and 18.9% of those age 65 or over.

References

Census-designated places in Hawaii County, Hawaii
Populated places on Hawaii (island)